Cley next the Sea (is a village and civil parish on the River Glaven in English county of Norfolk,  north-west of Holt and east of Blakeney. The main A149 coast road runs through the centre of the village, causing congestion in the summer months due to the tight, narrow streets. It lies within the Norfolk Coast AONB (Area of Outstanding Natural Beauty) and the North Norfolk Heritage Coast.

History
The village's name is of Anglo-Saxon origin and derives from the Old English for a settlement close to the sea with an abundance of clay.

In the Domesday Book, Cley is recorded as a settlement of 38 households located in the hundred of Holt. The village formed parts of the East Anglian estates of King William I.

A ruined building on the marshes is known as Blakeney Chapel; despite its name, it is in Cley parish, and probably never had a religious purpose. It is a Grade II listed building and scheduled monument which was likely an old iron smeltery.

Cley was once one of the busiest ports in England, where grain, malt, fish, spices, coal, cloth, barley and oats were exported or imported. The many Flemish gables in the town are a reminder of trade with the Low Countries. But despite its name, Cley has not been "next the sea" since the 17th century, due to land reclamation. Some of the buildings that once lined the quay remain, notably the 18th-century Cley Windmill. The windmill, a five-storey towermill, was owned by the family of singer James Blunt for many decades and operated as a bed and breakfast. The mill was sold in 2006, but continues to operate as a bed and breakfast on a non-profit making basis. It was used as a backdrop of the 1949 film Conspirator with Elizabeth Taylor. Cley Mill has often been depicted by local artists and was the subject of a painting by the 20th-century English landscape artist, Rowland Hilder.

After the silting up of the port, Cley had to find another industry; in the late 19th century, it became a holiday resort. The poet Rupert Brooke was staying in Cley with classics professor Francis Macdonald Cornford and his wife, the poet Frances Cornford, early in August 1914 when news came that Britain had entered what was to become the First World War. Brooke had dreamt about the war and woke to find it a reality. He did not speak to his hosts all day until Frances Cornford said, "But Rupert, you won't have to fight?" to which Brooke replied, "We shall all have to fight".

Geography
In the 2011 census, Cley was recorded as having a population of 437 residents living in 358 households.

Cley falls within the constituency of North Norfolk and is represented at Parliament by Duncan Baker of the Conservative Party.

Parish church
St Margaret's, Cley, is of Norman origin and is dedicated to Saint Margaret of Antioch. The great nave was completed in the 14th century with contributions from the de Vaux family. The church is Grade I listed.

Cley Marshes

The marshes around Cley are internationally important for their populations of rare breeding and visiting birds. Cley Marshes bird reserve has been in the care of the Norfolk Wildlife Trust since 1926, making it the oldest county Wildlife Trust reserve in Britain. Among resident breeding birds are avocet, bearded tit, bittern, marsh harrier and spoonbill. Winter visitors include brent goose, Eurasian wigeon, pintail and many species of wading birds. Cley, like neighbouring Salthouse is ideally situated at the apex of the North Norfolk coast as a staging ground for passage migrants, vagrants and rarities of all kinds. A new eco-friendly visitor centre opened in 2007 containing a café, shop, viewing areas (including viewing from a camera on the reserve), exhibition area, interpretation and toilets. The view from the visitor centre across the marsh to the sea is breathtaking. Cley Marshes is the home of the Bird Information Service, publishers of Birding World.
The shingle bank holds large numbers of yellow horned poppy.

Sea defences
The salt and fresh water marshes used to be very well protected. However the cost of replenishing the shingle spit grew too much for the village to sustain. The North Norfolk Shoreline Management Plan introduced by the Environment Agency has proposed a number of strategies in the light of continual erosion and predicted rising sea levels caused by global warming: these include Advance the line, Hold the line, Managed retreat and Do nothing. Even after extensive public consultation there is widespread local concern that the marshes will be lost to the North Sea.

Notable residents and appearance in media

William Jones was a merchant here in the 18th century. His daughter, Charlotte Jones, became a noted Royal miniature portrait painter.

James Blunt spent time, in his early years, at his grandfather's and later his father's windmill in the village.
 
Cley Old Hall was used as a location in the 1982 film The Ploughman's Lunch. In July 1997 the BBC filmed one of its BBC One balloon idents, which ran from 1997 to 2002, in the village.

War memorials
Cley's war memorials take the form of two carved stone tablets located inside St Margaret's Church. It lists the following names for the First World War:
 Second-Lieutenant Raven Cozens-Hardy (1886-1917), 4th Battalion, Royal Norfolk Regiment
 Sergeant Ernest W. E. Gibbs (1889-1916), 2nd Battalion, Royal Norfolk Regiment
 Stoker-First Class Herbert W. Ellwood (1879-1918), H.M. Tug Desire
 Stoker-Second Class James G. Elvin (1900-1918), HMS Vivid
 Deckhand George W. Grimes (1894-1916), H.M. Trawler
 Gunner Charles A. Gidney (1894-1914), Royal Horse Artillery
 Mate James W. Grimes (1885-1916), HMS Invincible
 Private Herbert Holman (d.1918), 4th Battalion, Bedfordshire Regiment
 Private William E. Barnes (1893-1916), 2nd (British Columbia Mounted Rifles) Battalion, Canadian Expeditionary Force
 Private John E. Barnes (1894-1916), 18th (Western Ontario) Battalion, Canadian Expeditionary Force
 Private Ralph Barnes (1886-1915), 1st Battalion, Essex Regiment
 Private Frederick J. Bishop (d.1916), 10th Battalion, Essex Regiment
 Private Cecil J. Bolton (1897-1917), 1/5th Battalion, Royal Norfolk Regiment
 Private Cecil A. Gathercole (1898-1917), 9th Battalion, Royal Norfolk Regiment
 Private Frederick W. Brett (1886-1916), 1/4th Battalion, Northumberland Fusiliers
 Private Albert G. Jeary (d.1916), 1st Battalion, Royal Warwickshire Regiment
 Private Robert W. E. Gibbs (1893-1917), 11th Battalion, East Yorkshire Regiment
 Private George H. Drinkwater (d.1917), 13th Battalion, East Yorkshire Regiment
 Robert Leeder

References

External links

Cley next the Sea
Villages in Norfolk
Populated coastal places in Norfolk
Civil parishes in Norfolk
Beaches of Norfolk
North Norfolk